Crosby Villa is a hamlet  in the civil parish of Crosscanonby in Cumbria, United Kingdom.

Historically, the name may have been spelled Crosby Villas.

Governance
Crosby Villa is in the parliamentary constituency of Workington. In the December 2019 general election, the Tory candidate for Workington, Mark Jenkinson, was elected the MP, overturning a 9.4 per cent Labour majority from the 2017 election to eject shadow environment secretary Sue Hayman by a margin of 4,136 votes. Until the December 2019 general election, the Labour Party had won the seat in every general election since 1979.The Conservative Party had only been elected once in Workington since World War II, at the 1976 by-election. Historically Crosby Villa has been a Labour supporting area.

Before Brexit for the European Parliament its residents voted to elect MEP's for the North West England constituency.

For Local Government purposes it is in the Ellen & Gilcrux Ward of Allerdale Borough Council and the Maryport North Ward of Cumbria County Council.

Crosby Villa has its own Parish Council; Crosscanonby Parish Council.

History
During the Roman period, there was a settlement near to the site of modern Crosby Villa called Garborough. The modern village was built to provide housing for miners at Rosegill and Bullgill coal mines during the 19th century. In addition to the seventy terraced houses, a chapel, shops, and a post office were provided, along with allotments for gardening. The chapel was built in 1863. There was no school, however, and the miners' children walked to Crosby to attend the school there. Bullgill pit closed in 1897, and Rosegill a few years later. This began a period of hardship for the village, exacerbated by the General Strike of 1926. Bullgill railway station closed to passengers in 1960, a few years before the Beeching axe. A road haulage firm called Duncan Hill was established in nearby Dearham in 1951, and later relocated to Crosby Villa, from where it continues to operate.

References

Hamlets in Cumbria
Crosscanonby